This is a list of episodes from the Singaporean situation comedy series Living with Lydia, which ran from November 2001 to February 2005. The whole series are available for free at Mediacorp's streaming service MeWatch.

Season 1 (2001-2002)
Season 1 from TVB

Season 2 (2002-2003)
Season 2 Site

Season 3 (2003)
Season 3 Site

Season 4 (2004-2005)

Trivia
All episode titles, except Season One, are given as they appear on TV broadcasts and on the DVD collection.
Every season is about a one year difference with each episode about a week apart in the timeline.
Lydia's husband is six feet underground Hong Kong which means he died.
The B in Billy B. Ong means "Boy".

External links

Living with Lydia Programme Showcase

Living with Lydia
Living with Lydia